Still Warm is a studio album by jazz guitarist John Scofield. It features keyboardist Don Grolnick, bass guitarist Darryl Jones and drummer Omar Hakim.

The album was his second for Gramavision and was recorded right after leaving Miles Davis's band. He used two musicians from the Davis group: Jones and Hakim, both of whom had also recently recorded and toured with Sting. The album was critically acclaimed, though The Penguin Jazz Guide notes that "even some Scofield devotees seem unpersuaded of its considerable merits".

The album is ranked number 998 in All-Time Top 1000 Albums (3rd edition, 2000).

Track listing

Personnel
John Scofield – electric guitar
Don Grolnick – keyboards
Darryl Jones – bass guitar
Omar Hakim – drums

References 

1986 albums
John Scofield albums
Gramavision Records albums